Andrew Crawford (born 27 July 1971) is an Irish entrepreneur and the former founder and CEO of The Book Depository. He was born in Zambia, of Irish heritage. Crawford, was educated at Downside School and then The University of Liverpool studying engineering science and industrial management. After a brief spell working for his family firm, Crawford worked in the 1990s in security and specialist risk management working as a Private Security Contractor throughout EMEA.

Having been part of the startup team for Bookpages.co.uk sold to Amazon.com, he went on to found The Book Depository in 2004 which is working to make "All Books Available to All". It was later sold to Amazon.

Crawford is also founder of Dodo Press, a publisher which reissues up to 200 classic titles a week.

He is a regular columnist for The Bookseller.

Sources

External links
 

1971 births
Alumni of the University of Liverpool
Living people
People educated at Downside School
Irish businesspeople
Amazon (company) people